There were a number of race riots in Philadelphia during the 1919 Red Summer.

Background
As more and more African-Americans moved from the south to the industrial north, they started to move into predominantly white neighborhoods. In 1918, for four days starting July 25, there was a race riot in Chester and Philadelphia. When things finally settled down, 3 black and 2 white people had died from their injuries.

May 1919

In Philadelphia, the black migration created very high tensions in the area surrounding Twenty-fifth and Pine streets. Making things worse, a local gang had been terrorizing the new black tenants. On May 9, a large mob of white people clashed with a large black group. The mob then broke open the door at 2535 Pine street and tried to
eject George Grahm and his black family who had moved there a week earlier. A number of people were later arrested.

July 1919
The New York Times wrote an article that described two riots during the Red Summer, one on July 7 and 31. Authors Rucker & Upton talk about during a carnival, a large group of whites fought a group of blacks. The violence was quickly suppressed when over 100 police showed up and made arrests.

Aftermath

This uprising was one of several incidents of civil unrest that took place during the so-called Red Summer of 1919. The Summer consisted of terrorist attacks on black communities, and white oppression, in over three dozen cities and counties. In most cases, white mobs attacked African-American neighborhoods. In some cases, black community groups resisted the attacks, especially in Chicago and Washington, D.C. Most deaths occurred in rural areas during events like the Elaine Massacre in Arkansas, where an estimated 100 to 240 black people and 5 white people were killed. Also occurring in 1919 were the Chicago Race Riot and Washington D.C. race riot which killed 38 and 39 people respectively, with both events having many more non-fatal injuries and extensive property damage reaching millions of dollars.

See also
1964 Philadelphia race riot
Washington race riot of 1919
Mass racial violence in the United States
List of incidents of civil unrest in the United States

Bibliography 
Notes

References   

   
 - Total pages: 930 
 - Total pages: 234 

1919 in Pennsylvania
1919 in military history
1919 riots in the United States
July 1919 events
African-American history between emancipation and the civil rights movement
History of racism in Pennsylvania
Racially motivated violence against African Americans
Red Summer
Riots and civil disorder in Philadelphia
White American riots in the United States